Zoroaster is the debut album by American stoner metal band Acid King. It was released in August 1995 on CD through Sympathy for the Record Industry. In 2006 it was combined with the band's debut EP, Acid King, and released as the compilation album The Early Years.

Zoroaster was the last Acid King album to feature their original bassist, Peter Lucas.

Track listing
All songs written by Lori S., except where noted.

Credits
Lori S. – vocals, guitar 
Peter Lucas – bass, backing vocals
Joey Osbourne – drums
Billy Anderson – engineering
Audrey Daniele – photography
Bill George – artwork, layout design

References

Acid King albums
1995 debut albums
Sympathy for the Record Industry albums